Cochliobolus cymbopogonis is a fungal plant pathogen.  Those fungi that do not need a partner to mate are termed homothallic (self-fertile).  C. cymbopogonis is homothallic.

References

External links 
 Index Fungorum
 USDA ARS Fungal Database

Fungal plant pathogens and diseases
Cochliobolus
Fungi described in 1942